Clifford Vivian Devon Curtis (born 27 July 1968) is a New Zealand actor. His film credits include Once Were Warriors (1994), Three Kings (1999), Training Day (2001), Whale Rider (2002), Collateral Damage (2002), Sunshine, Live Free or Die Hard (both 2007), The Dark Horse (2014), for which he won the Asia Pacific Screen Award for Best Performance by an Actor, Doctor Sleep (2019), and Avatar: The Way of Water (2022). Curtis had television series roles on NBC's Trauma and ABC's Body of Proof and Missing. From 2015 to 2017, he portrayed Travis Manawa on the AMC horror drama series Fear the Walking Dead.

He is the co-owner of the independent New Zealand production company Whenua Films.

Early life
Curtis was born on 27 July 1968 in Rotorua in the Bay of Plenty Region. He is one of eight children, the son of an amateur dancer. Curtis is of Māori descent; his tribal affiliations are Te Arawa and Ngāti Hauiti.

As a boy he studied mau rākau, a traditional Māori form of taiaha fighting, with Māori elder Mita Mohi on Mokoia Island, which nurtured his abilities as a performer in kapa haka. Curtis later performed as a breakdancer and competitively in rock 'n' roll dance competitions. He received his secondary education at Edmund Rice College, Rotorua. Curtis graduated from Toi Whakaari: New Zealand Drama School in 1989 with a Diploma in Acting.

Career

New Zealand 
Curtis started acting in amateur productions of musicals Fiddler on the Roof and Man of La Mancha with the Kapiti Players and the Mantis Cooperative Theatre Company, before attending the New Zealand Drama School and Teatro Dimitri Scoula in Switzerland. He worked at a number of New Zealand theatre companies, including Downstage, Mercury Theatre, Bats Theatre, and Centre Point. His stage roles include Happy End, The Merry Wives of Windsor, Othello, The Cherry Orchard, Porgy and Bess, Weeds, Macbeth, Serious Money, and The End of the Golden Weather.

His first feature film role was a small part in the Oscar-nominated Jane Campion film The Piano. He went on to win attention in Once Were Warriors, one of the most successful films released on New Zealand screens; the line "Uncle fucken Bully" referring to Curtis's character spoken by "Jake the Muss", played by Temuera Morrison, became one of New Zealand film's most memorable and quoted lines, as well as being part of the "Kiwiana" trend. He played Kahu in the short-film Kahu & Maia, a contemporary depiction of a Ngāti Kahungunu and Ngāti Rongomaiwahine legend. He played a seducer in the melodrama Desperate Remedies. In 2000 Curtis starred as family man Billy Williams in Jubilee, before playing father to the lead character in the international hit Whale Rider.

In 2004 with producer Ainsley Gardiner, Curtis formed independent film production company Whenua Films. The goals of the company are to support the growth of the New Zealand indigenous film-making scene, and support local short filmmakers. He and Gardiner were appointed to manage the development and production of films for the Short Films Fund for 2005–06 by the New Zealand Film Commission. They have produced several shorts under the new company banner, notably Two Cars, One Night, which received an Academy Award nomination in 2005, and Hawaikii by director Mike Jonathan in 2006. Both short films circulated through many of the prestigious international film festivals like the Berlinale.

At the 2006 Cannes Film Festival, Miramax Films bought US distribution rights to relationship comedy Eagle vs Shark, the first feature film directed by Taika Waititi. Waititi's follow-up feature Boy, also from Whenua Films, went on to become the highest grossing New Zealand film released.

In 2014, Curtis played the lead role in The Dark Horse, which the National Radio review called "one of the greatest New Zealand films ever made." The New Zealand Herald praised him for his "towering performance" as real-life Gisborne speed chess player and coach Genesis Potini, who died in 2011. Curtis studied chess and deliberately put on weight for the role.

International 

Curtis has appeared in the films Martin Scorsese's Bringing Out the Dead (1999), Three Kings (1999), the drug drama Blow (2001) with Johnny Depp, Training Day (2001), Collateral Damage (2002), Live Free or Die Hard (2007), Sunshine (2007), Push (2009), and Colombiana (2011). In M. Night Shyamalan's The Last Airbender (2010), he played the main villain, Fire Lord Ozai. Curtis portrayed Lt. Cortez in the film Last Knights (2015) and Jesus Christ in the film Risen (2016).

In the NBC TV drama Trauma, he played daredevil flight medic Reuben "Rabbit" Palchuck. Curtis was cast as Travis Manawa, a leading male role of the AMC TV series Fear the Walking Dead, the spin-off of The Walking Dead.

In 2017, Curtis was cast as Tonowari and is set to appear in the four sequels to Avatar, including Avatar: The Way of Water and Avatar 3.

In 2019, he played Jonah Hobbs, the brother of Luke Hobbs (Dwayne Johnson) in Fast & Furious Presents: Hobbs & Shaw; their characters are Samoan.

Curtis stars in True Spirit alongside Teagan Croft and Anna Paquin. It began airing on Netflix on 3 February 2023. The movie is based on the journey of Jessica Watson, a 16-year-old Australian sailor attempting a solo global circumnavigation.

Personal life
He was married in late 2009 in a private ceremony at his home, and has four children. He is Roman Catholic.

When asked about being an "all-purpose ethnic" actor, he said, "It's been a real advantage, I love being ethnic, I love the color of my skin. There are limitations in the business, that's a reality, but I've been given such wonderful opportunities."

Filmography

Film

Television

References

External links

 
 Cliff Curtis on NZ On Screen

1968 births
20th-century New Zealand male actors
21st-century New Zealand male actors
Asia Pacific Screen Award winners
Living people
New Zealand expatriate actors in the United States
New Zealand male film actors
New Zealand male Māori actors
New Zealand male television actors
New Zealand Roman Catholics
People from Rotorua
People educated at John Paul College, Rotorua
Ngāti Hauiti people
Te Arawa people
Toi Whakaari alumni